Tou (Tou bryggeri) was a brewery established in 1855 at Tau near Stavanger, Norway.

Tou brewery started producing beer and flour in 1855 at Tau outside Stavanger. In 1901, the production of beer was moved to Lervik in Stavanger.
In the 1970s the production was again moved to new facilities in Forus. Christianssands Bryggeri (CB) was in 1964 a subsidiary of Tou. But CB was in 1990 demerged into a separate company (in 1999 they acquired by Hansa Borg). Tou merged in 1990 with Nora Industrier and became part of beverage company Ringnes. In June 2003, the Board of Ringnes closed down the brewery, despite strong local protests. 15 August 2003, the brewery closed down. The last bottle rolled off the assembly line, and the production was moved to Oslo. Today Tou is still produced. Tou brewery was Norway's first producer of carbonated apple juice. The brewery was later acquired by the Ringnes brewery in Oslo.

References

Breweries in Norway
Companies based in Stavanger
Food and drink companies disestablished in 2003
Food and drink companies established in 1855
2003 disestablishments in Norway
Norwegian companies established in 1855